Fuat Dündar (born 1971) is a Turkish academic, associate professor at the TOBB University of Economics and Technology in Ankara and historian. He received a doctorate in history from the School for Advanced Studies in the Social Sciences in France, with a dissertation titled L'ingénierie Ethnique du Comité Union et Progrès et la Turcisation de l'Anatolie (1913-1918) ("The Ethnic Engineering of the Committee of Union and Progress and the Turkification of Anatolia (1913–1918)"). In a review of his book Crime of Numbers, Simon Payaslian states "That Dündar accepts Ottoman sources uncritically is the most fundamental problem with this work." Dündar also participated in Workshop for Armenian/Turkish Scholarship and contributed a chapter to its book, A Question of Genocide, in which he "provides a fresh interpretation of the deportation", according to Bedross Der Matossian, who nevertheless criticized the chapter for its incomplete understanding of the concentration camps in the Syrian desert as revealed in Armenian sources.

Works

References

1971 births
Living people
21st-century Turkish historians
Academic staff of the TOBB University of Economics and Technology
School for Advanced Studies in the Social Sciences alumni
Historians of the Armenian genocide